Jacob Esposito (born 13 May 1995), is an Australian professional footballer who plays as a right back for Mt Druitt Rangers.

External links

1995 births
Living people
Australian soccer players
Association football defenders
National Premier Leagues players
Sydney United 58 FC players
Hakoah Sydney City East FC players
Newcastle Jets FC players
Livingston F.C. players
Airdrieonians F.C. players